The 1953–54 UCLA Bruins men's basketball team represented the University of California, Los Angeles during the 1953–54 NCAA men's basketball season and were members of the Pacific Coast Conference. The Bruins were led by sixth year head coach John Wooden. They finished the regular season with a record of 18–7 and finished 2nd in the PCC Southern Division with a record of 7–5.

Previous season

The Bruins finished the regular season with a record of 16–8 and were 3rd in the PCC Southern Division with a record of 8–4.

Roster

Schedule

|-
!colspan=9 style=|Regular Season

Source

References

UCLA Bruins men's basketball seasons
Ucla
UCLA Bruins Basketball
UCLA Bruins Basketball